Saraswatichandra may refer to:
 Saraswatichandra (novel), a Gujarati novel by Govardhanram Madhavram Tripathi
 Saraswatichandra (film), a 1968 Hindi film based on the novel
 Saraswatichandra (TV series), a 2013 Hindi TV series based on the novel